Sanam Teri Kasam may refer to:
Sanam Teri Kasam (1982 film), a 1982 Indian Hindi feature film
Sanam Teri Kasam (2009 film), a 2009 Indian Hindi romantic drama film
Sanam Teri Kasam (2016 film), a 2016 Indian Hindi film